Michael Newrzella (September 15, 1967 – June 27, 1993) was a German police officer and member of GSG 9, the counter-terrorism and special operations unit of the German Federal Police, who was killed by the Red Army Faction.

Newrzella participated in a joint operation by the Federal Criminal Police Office and the Federal Border Police to arrest Red Army Faction members Wolfgang Grams and Birgit Hogefeld at the train station in Bad Kleinen. 
Grams managed to shoot at the two officers attempting to arrest him, missing the other officer but hitting Newrzella, severely wounding him and he died a few hours later.

Reportedly, after Newrzella had been shot, Grams then attempted to commit suicide by shooting himself, surviving but dying later that day in hospital. Shortly after the Bad Kleinen operation, there were allegations that Grams had not shot himself but was executed by a police officer that shot him in the head from close distance. The Staatsanwaltschaft Schwerin investigated these allegations and concluded in January 1994 that they were incorrect. Grams' parents challenged this conclusion in court, but it was upheld by five different courts, including the European Court of Human Rights in 1999.

References

External links
GSG 9 Action in Bad Kleinen (German Wikipedia)
Inofficial memorial page (www.odmp.info)

1967 births
1993 deaths
People from North Rhine-Westphalia
Deaths by firearm in Germany
Victims of the Red Army Faction
Male murder victims
German police officers killed in the line of duty